Grigory Nikolaevich Oriol (16 September 1904 – 3 February 1974) was a Soviet armored corps general.

Biography

Early life
Oriol joined the Red Army in 1924. At the mid-1930s, he attended the Military Academy of Mechanization and Motorization (now part of the Combined Arms Academy), where he became close friends with General Sergei Shtemenko. After graduation, he was assigned to the 22nd Maxim Gorky Cavalry Division, commanding the mechanized regiment and later the armored regiment.

World War II
At the beginning of the Great Patriotic War he headed the Armoured Automobiles department in the General Staff, and later became the commander of the armored and mechanized divisions in the 16th Army, under General Rokossovsky. As such, he took part in the battle of Moscow. Oriol remained the commander of Rokossovsky's tanks, and headed the Mechanized and Armored Formations of the Bryansk Front, which later was re-formed as the Don Front. While stationed in the Don Front, he participated in the Battle of Stalingrad. On 17 November 1942, he was given the rank of a major general. After the Don Front was renamed Central Front, Oriol supervised its armored units during the Battle of Kursk. Oriol remained in his post as the Central Front became the 1st Belorussian Front. At 5 November 1943, he was promoted to lieutenant general. When Marshal Georgy Zhukov replaced Rokossovsky, Oriol headed the tank formations under his command during Vistula-Oder Offensive and the Battle of Berlin.

Post-war years
After the war, Oriol was appointed inspector-general the armored and mechanized forces stationed in all the USSR's Military Districts. At 1961, he became an inspector in the Ministry of Defense and was given his final promotion to Colonel-General on 1962. He retired from the Armed Forces during 1969.

Honours and awards
 Order of Lenin
 Order of the Red Banner, three times
 Order of Suvorov, 1st class and 2nd class
 Order of Kutuzov, 1st class
 Order of the Patriotic War, 1st class

References

External links
 Grigory Oriol's picture on Generals.Dk.

1904 births
1974 deaths
Soviet colonel generals
Soviet military personnel of World War II
Recipients of the Order of Lenin
Recipients of the Order of Suvorov, 1st class
Recipients of the Order of Kutuzov, 1st class
Recipients of the Order of the Red Banner